Liechtenstein competed at the 2012 Winter Youth Olympics in Innsbruck, Austria. The Liechtenstein team was made up of two male athletes, in two sports.

Alpine skiing

Liechtenstein qualified one boy in alpine skiing.

Boy

Cross country skiing

Liechtenstein qualified one boy athlete.

Boy

Sprint

See also
Liechtenstein at the 2012 Summer Olympics

References

Nations at the 2012 Winter Youth Olympics
2012 in Liechtenstein sport
Liechtenstein at the Youth Olympics